Fool for Love may refer to:

Theatre, film and television
 Fool for Love (play), a 1983 play by Sam Shepard
 Fool for Love (1985 film), a film adaptation of Shepard's play, directed by Robert Altman
 Fool for Love (2010 film), a romantic comedy film directed by Charlie Nguyễn
 "Fool for Love" (Buffy the Vampire Slayer), a 2000 episode of Buffy the Vampire Slayer
 "Fools for Love", a 2006 episode of House
 "Fools for Love" (Law & Order), an episode of Law & Order

Music
 "Fool for Love" (song), a 2019 song by Nadine Coyle
 "Fool for Love", song by Sandy Rogers, soundtrack title song of Fool for Love
 "Fool for Love", 2009 single release by Sonia
 "Fool for Love", 2004 song by Tara Blaise
 "Fool for Love", 1987 song by Belinda Carlisle on her Heaven on Earth album
 "A Fool for Love", a song by Bryan Ferry from Frantic
 "Fool for Love", a song by Das Pop
 Fool for Love, an album by Paul Burch
 "Fool for Love", a song by Lee Hi from First Love
 "Fool for Love", a song by Lord Huron
 "Fool for Love", a song by DottyWomorr TikTok